Araiwa Kamenosuke (荒岩 亀之助, March 1, 1871 – September 3, 1920) was a Japanese sumo wrestler from Tottori Prefecture. His highest rank was ōzeki.

Career
He made his debut in January 1894. He was promoted to the top makuuchi division in January 1897. He had the best record in six tournaments before the modern yūshō system awarding a championship to the wrestler with the best record was established. In two of these runs he did not suffer a single defeat or draw.

In May 1900, he had the best record as sekiwake without a single defeat or draw but was not promoted to ōzeki. The reason is said to be that he was small compared to other ōzeki.

In May 1905, he managed to reach ōzeki, and had a perfect tournament without a single defeat or draw. However, in the end, he was never promoted to yokozuna. He retired as an active wrestler in January 1909. His winning average in the top makuuchi division was over .800.

Top Division Record
 

    
    
  
 
    
    
  

    
    
  

    
    
  

    
    
  

    
    
  

    
    
  

    
    
  

    
    
  

    
    
  

    
    
  

    
    
  

     
  

*Championships for the best record in a tournament were not recognized or awarded before the 1909 summer tournament, and the above unofficial championships are historically conferred. For more information see yūshō.

References

See also
List of past sumo wrestlers
Glossary of sumo terms

1871 births
1920 deaths
Japanese sumo wrestlers
Ōzeki
Sumo people from Tottori Prefecture